Nikola Marjanović is a Serbian retired football defender. He spent eight years of his professional career playing in the Yugoslav First League, collecting 190 appearances. In 1986, he moved to Sweden, where he played with Degerfors until he retired in the early 1990s.

References

Living people
Serbian footballers
Yugoslav footballers
Yugoslav First League players
FK Zemun players
HNK Rijeka players
FK Partizan players
FK Vojvodina players
Degerfors IF players
Serbian expatriate footballers
Expatriate footballers in Sweden
1955 births
Association football defenders